Love Life is an American romantic comedy anthology series created by  Sam Boyd and starring Anna Kendrick  that premiered on the HBO Max streaming service on May 27, 2020. The series follows a different person each season from their first romance until their last romance and "how the people we're with along the way make us into who we are when we finally end up with someone forever."  

Love Life was cancelled after 2 seasons.

Cast

Main
Anna Kendrick as Darby Carter (season 1; special guest star season 2)
Zoë Chao as Sara Yang (season 1; guest star season 2), Darby's roommate and best friend 
Sasha Compère as Mallory Moore (season 1; guest star season 2), Darby's other roommate and friend
Peter Vack as Jim (season 1; guest star season 2), Sara's boyfriend and later ex-boyfriend
William Jackson Harper as Marcus Watkins (season 2)
Jessica Williams as Mia Hines (season 2)
Comedian CP as Yogi (season 2)
Punkie Johnson as Ida Watkins (season 2)

The series is narrated by Lesley Manville (season 1) and Keith David (season 2).

Recurring

Jin Ha as Augie Jeong
Hope Davis as Claudia Hoffman, Darby's mother
Janet Hubert as Donna Watkins, Marcus' mother (season 2)
Jordan Rock as Trae Lang (season 2)
Leslie Bibb as Becca Evans (season 2)
John Earl Jelks as Kirby Watkins (season 2)
Arian Moayed as Kian Parsa (season 2)
Steven Boyer as Josh (season 2)

Guest
Scoot McNairy as Bradley Field
Maureen Sebastian as Kate Field
Nadia Quinn as Lola
Gus Halper as Danny Two-Phones
Nick Thune as Magnus Lund
James LeGros as Larry Carter
Jackson Demott Hill as Hunter Carter
Siobhan Fallon Hogan as Darby's therapist
Courtney Grosbeck as teenager Darby Carter
John Gallagher Jr. as Luke Ducharme
Griffin Gluck portrays teenager Luke Ducharme
Kingsley Ben-Adir as Grant
Maya Kazan as Emily Hexton (season 2)
Kimberly Elise as Suzanné Hayward (season 2)
Ego Nwodim as Ola Adebayo (season 2)
Blair Underwood as Leon Hines (season 2)

Episodes

Series overview

Season 1 (2020)

Season 2 (2021)

Production

Development
On May 23, 2019, it was announced that WarnerMedia had ordered a romantic comedy anthology straight to series with the first season consisting of ten episodes for HBO Max. The series was created by Sam Boyd who was also expected to executive produce alongside Anna Kendrick, Paul Feig, Jessie Henderson, and Bridget Bedard. The pilot was also written and directed by Sam Boyd. Production companies involved with the series were slated to consist of Lionsgate Television and Feigco Entertainment. On June 11, 2020, HBO Max renewed the series for a second season. Janet Hubert, Jordan Rock, and Maya Kazan joined the second season as executive producers.

Casting
Alongside the initial series announcement, Anna Kendrick was also cast in a lead role. On August 13, 2019, it was reported that Zoë Chao, Sasha Compère and Peter Vack joined the cast in starring roles, with Scoot McNairy joining in a recurring role. On November 5, 2020, William Jackson Harper was cast to headline the second season with Kendrick set to reprise her role of Darby as a guest. On May 3, 2021, it was announced that Jessica Williams and Chris Powell joined the main cast. On July 20, 2021, Punkie Johnson was cast in a starring role while Leslie Bibb, John Earl Jelks, and Arian Moayed were cast in recurring roles for the second season. Kimberly Elise, Ego Nwodim, and Blair Underwood also joined the cast as guest stars for the second season. The following month, Keith David was cast in the role of the season's narrator while Steven Boyer joined the cast in a recurring role.

Filming
Filming had begun by August 2019 in Queens, New York. The final scene of the finale was filmed on March 12, 2020, and production was forced to shut down the next day because of the COVID-19 pandemic. While several more days of filming pick-ups had been planned, they were able to complete the season without those additional shots.

Cancellation
In December 2022, Love Life was canceled after two seasons, with plans to remove the series from the service.

Release 
The series premiered on May 27, 2020, on HBO Max. In Australia, the series was released on May 27, 2020, on Stan, and public broadcaster BBC acquired television broadcast rights in the United Kingdom (where the series started airing on the broadcaster's main BBC One channel) to the series on September 10, 2020. The series is streaming on Lionsgate Play in India. In the United States, the series was aired on TBS on August 22, 2021.
The second season was scheduled to debut on October 28, 2021, with the first three episodes available immediately, follow by three episodes on November 4, and the final four episodes on November 11. The series was removed from HBO Max in December 2022.

Reception
On Rotten Tomatoes, the first season has an approval rating of 65% based on reviews from 48 critics, with an average rating of 5.8/10. The site's critics consensus reads: "Love Life first season breezes by on Anna Kendrick's charms, but those looking for a real connection may find its featherweight familiarness frustrating." On Metacritic it has a weighted average score of 54 out of 100 based on reviews from 22 critics, indicating "mixed or average reviews". On Rotten Tomatoes, the second season holds an approval rating of 100% based on reviews from 12 critics, with an average rating of 7/10. The site's critics consensus states: "William Jackson Harper's Love Life is easy to get caught up in thanks to the star's charm and this season's thoughtful exploration of a real romantic conundrum."

References

External links
 
 

2020 American television series debuts
2021 American television series endings
2020s American anthology television series
2020s American romantic comedy television series
English-language television shows
HBO Max original programming
Television series by Lionsgate Television
Television shows filmed in New York (state)
Television shows set in New York City